is a Japanese architect.

Born in Hokkaido in 1971, he graduated from the University of Tokyo in 1994, and established his own office, Sou Fujimoto Architects, in 2000. Noted for delicate light structures and permeable enclosures, Fujimoto designed several houses, and in 2013, was selected to design the temporary Serpentine Gallery pavilion in London. In 2021, Fujimoto received the master degree from l’École Spéciale d’Architecture in Paris.

Fujimoto published a book in 2008 called Sou Fujimoto: Primitive Future. It contains an overview of his projects up to that date, and it explains his concept of primitive future and how he uses it in his work.

Career 
After establishing Sou Fujimoto Architects in 2000, Fujimoto went on to design buildings across Japan and Europe. Many of his designs are built around his idea that the function of a building is decided by human behavior. In 2019, Fujimoto was selected as one of 23 architects to "reinvent" Paris. His contributions to this project include a redesign of a plot in the 17th arrondissement of Paris.

Selected works
 Final Wooden House, Kumamoto, 2005–08
Children's Centre for Psychiatric Rehabilitation, Hokkaido, Japan, 2006
T House, Gunma, Japan, 2006-2010
 N House, Oita, 2008
 House before House, Utsunomiya, 2009
 Tokyo Apartment, Tabashi-ku, Tokyo, 2006-10
Musashino Art University Museum and Library, Tokyo, Japan, 2010
Toilet in Nature, Chiba, Japan, 2012
 House K, Nishinomiya, Hyogo, Japan, 2011-2013
 Serpentine Gallery Pavilion, London, 2013
 Bus Stop in  Krumbach, Austria, 2014
 Naoshima Pavilion, Naoshima, Kagawa, Japan, 2016 
 L'Arbre Blanc, Montpellier, France, 2017 (est.)
House of Hungarian Music, Budapest, Hungary, 2022
Mille Arbres (A Thousand Trees), Paris, France, 2016-2023 (est.)

Awards 
 JIA New Face Award, 2004
 International Design Competition for the Environment Art Forum, 1st Prize, 2004
 Wooden House Competition, Kumamoto, 1st Prize, 2005
 Architectural Review Award Grand Prize, 2006

 Kenneth F. Brown Architecture Design Award, 2007
 Japanese Institute of Architecture Grand Prize, 2008
 Wallpaper Design Award, 2009
 Taiwan Tower International Competition: First Prize, 2011 
 Marcus Prize for Architecture, 2013

References

External links
 

Japanese architects
1971 births
Living people
People from Hokkaido
University of Tokyo alumni